Atoka may refer to:

Atoka is the word for cranberry in the language of the first nations in eastern Canada, specifically Quebec. The Algonquins of Wisconsin dubbed the fruit "atoqua”. 
Often using food as medicine, Native American medicine men used cranberries in poultices to draw poison from arrow wounds. Cranberry is known to have both healing and antimicrobial properties.

Atoka, Oklahoma
Atoka County, Oklahoma
Atoka, Tennessee
Atoka, Virginia
Atoka (meteorite)